The Liability (also known as The Hitman's Apprentice) is a 2013 British black comedy crime-thriller film directed by Craig Viveiros and written by John Wrathall. The film stars Tim Roth, Talulah Riley, Jack O'Connell and Peter Mullan. The film is about a teenager sent to do a day of driving for his mum's gangster boyfriend, which leads him into the world of crime.

Plot
Young and naive 19-year-old slacker, Adam (Jack O'Connell), lives with his mum, Nicky (Kierston Wareing), in the home of her intimidating gangster boyfriend, Peter (Peter Mullan) and is sent to conduct a day of driving for Peter's associate after Adam inadvertently views an incriminating video on Peter's laptop. This takes Adam on the road with aging hitman, Roy (Tim Roth), as he enters a world of murder for 24 hours. After Roy kills a man, Danil, living in a camper in the woods, He tries to force Adam to kill a mysterious girl (Talulah Riley) who seems to be an unsuspecting witness of the murder. Adam refrains from doing so, giving her the chance to escape and drive away in their vehicle.

Not pleased, Roy uses Adam to hitchhike and they steal a camper van from an elderly couple. They call the girl on Adam's phone that was left in the car she took, striking a deal to give her £7000 in return for the bag of evidence that was left in the vehicle, even though Roy doesn't actually have the entire amount. Roy robs a diner to make up the rest. He holds the diner employees at gunpoint and uses them as hostages to make sure the deal goes through.

Having reclaimed the bag, Roy and Adam plan to switch vehicles and dispose of the evidence. However, Roy knocks Adam unconscious at a quiet roadside area. Before Roy can kill and dismember his body, the girl, who followed them, runs over Roy and kidnaps Adam.

Retreating to a water pumping station, the girl ties Adam to a rail upstairs. She claims her sister was sold in a line of sex trafficking, by Sergej to Ivan, to Danil and finally to an "Englishman".  She shows Adam a photo of her sister who bears resemblance to the girl in the video on Peter's laptop. Swiping through the photos on Adams phone the girl discovers a picture of his mother and her boyfriend. She asks Adam for Peters name, claiming Sergej and Ivan also had his picture.

Roy finds his way to the hideout and confronts the girl, starting to fight with her. Adam manages to free one of his hands and retrieve Roy's fallen gun. Regaining his memory, Adam realizes Roy attempted to kill him. Irritated, he fires shots off, injuring Roy as the girl flees. Roy pleads with him to stop shooting and tells Adam he was given orders to kill him but no reason, with Adam's death meant to be part of "the job" all along. Adam realizes it must be because he saw the video incriminating Peter of sex-trafficking.

They leave the factory, finding out the girl left behind the car, money and other belongings she had taken. Adam drives Roy in their stolen van to a church for Roy's daughter's wedding. During the ride, Roy reveals he spared Adam's life because of his innocence and tells him he has a second chance at life while Peter believes he's dead. After dropping off Roy at the church, where his fate is left ambiguous, Adam takes the van away to set fire to it and destroy any evidence linking them to the murder done in their travels, but keeps the gun.

Adam returns home, confronting Peter with the gun and alerting his mum Nicky to his double-crossing ways. Adam attacks Peter, who gets a hold of the gun, Peter knocks out Adam's mum and drags him out to the car park. There, the girl shows up and shoots Peter for what he did to her sister. Peter starts to strangle her until she stabs and kills him.

The girl gets in her car, opens the passenger door and gives an inviting look to a bewildered Adam.

Cast
Tim Roth as Roy
Talulah Riley as The Girl
Jack O'Connell as Adam
Peter Mullan as Peter
Kierston Wareing as Nicky
Christopher Hatherall as Ivan
Jack McBride as Mr. Hippy
Jenny Pike as Mrs. Hippy
Clive Shaw as Sniper
Andy McAdam as Diner Cashier
Neil Eddy as Man in Photo
Steven Charles Stobbs as Shop Keeper
Simon Manley as Diner Customer
Jimmy Knights as the Sniper Victim

References

External links

 

2013 films
British thriller films
2010s English-language films
2010s British films